David B. Hermelin (December 27, 1936 – November 22, 2000) was United States ambassador to Norway and a Detroit area philanthropist and entrepreneur and a graduate of the University of Michigan’s Ross School of Business.

The David B. Hermelin Volunteer Fundraising Award at the University of Michigan honors David Hermelin. The ORT Hermelin College of Engineering in Netanya, Israel, was named in his honor. It opened in October, 2000.

On December 13, 2000, he was presented, posthumously, with the Presidential Citizens Medal by President Clinton.

In 2000, Hermelin died of a brain tumor at 63 years old.

See also 
List of notable brain tumor patients

References

Sources
ORT Hermelin College of Engineering: Biography
University of Michigan press release
United States Department of State: Ambassadors to Norway

1936 births
2000 deaths
People from Detroit
Ambassadors of the United States to Norway
Presidential Citizens Medal recipients
Ross School of Business alumni